63rd meridian may refer to:

63rd meridian east, a line of longitude east of the Greenwich Meridian
63rd meridian west, a line of longitude west of the Greenwich Meridian